100 stepeni is the second studio album by Montenegrin dance-pop recording artist Dado Polumenta. It was released 6 January 2005 through Grand Production.

Track listing
Ana Marija
Srce je nebitno
Kad pijem
100 stepeni
Nervi od čelika
Aj živa bila
Pozovite 93
Ekstaza
Oči od stida
Pogledaj kako igram
Mila (My Sweet Bitherness)

External links
100 stepeni at Discogs

2005 albums
Dado Polumenta albums
Grand Production albums